"Hope on the Rocks" is a song written and recorded by American country music artist Toby Keith. It was released in November 2012 as the second single and title track from his album Hope on the Rocks.

Critical reception
Billy Dukes of Taste of Country gave the song four stars out of five, writing that "in just a few lines, the loved singer shows how capable he is of capturing the country nation’s emotions in a story that’s just far enough removed from reality to still be enjoyable." Matt Bjorke of Roughstock gave the song a favorable review, calling it "a fantastic, well-written song that certainly ranks amongst the best songs that Toby's ever written."

Music video
The music video was directed by Michael Salomon and premiered in November 2012.

Chart performance
"Hope on the Rocks" debuted at number 57 on the U.S. Billboard Country Airplay chart for the week of November 24, 2012. It also debuted at number 48 on the U.S. Billboard Hot Country Songs chart for the week of December 15, 2012. It also debuted at number 20 on the U.S. Billboard Bubbling Under Hot 100 Singles chart for the week of February 16, 2013.

Year-end charts

References

2012 singles
2012 songs
Country ballads
2010s ballads
Toby Keith songs
Songs written by Toby Keith
Music videos directed by Michael Salomon
Songs about alcohol
Show Dog-Universal Music singles